Richmond Kickers Future was an American soccer team based in Richmond, Virginia, United States. Founded in 2002 as part of the development system of the Richmond Kickers USL Second Division franchise, the team played in the USL Premier Development League (PDL), the fourth tier of the American Soccer Pyramid, until 2009, when the franchise folded and the team left the league.

The team played its home games at Sports Backers Stadium. The team's colors were red, white and black.

Year-by-year

Honors
 USL PDL Eastern Conference Champions 2005
 USL PDL Mid Atlantic Division Champions 2005
 USL PDL Mid Atlantic Division Champions 2003

James River Cup
The James River Cup was an annual competition held between the Richmond Kickers and the Virginia Beach Mariners (formerly Hampton Roads Mariners) in which the team with the most points at the conclusion of all scheduled matches between the two teams. The Cup was held every year since 1996 with the exception of 1997 and 2001 when Virginia Beach did not field a team. In 2007, the Virginia Beach team was disbanded.

For the 2008 season, the James River Cup was contested between the Richmond Kickers organization and the Hampton Roads Piranhas organization.  The cup went to the organization that had the most points in games between their PDL and W-League teams.  The series ended up tied 2-2-1, with the Piranhas winning the Cup on goal difference.

Winners
2008: Hampton Roads Piranhas
2007: Not Held
2006: Virginia Beach Mariners
2005: Richmond Kickers
2004: Richmond Kickers
2003: Richmond Kickers
2002: Richmond Kickers
2001: Not Held
2000: Richmond Kickers
1999: Richmond Kickers
1998: Richmond Kickers
1997: Not Held
1996: Hampton Roads Mariners

Head coaches
  Martin Dell (2005–2006)
  Ihor Dotsenko (2007)
  Kyle Lessig (2008)

Stadia
 University of Richmond Stadium; Richmond, Virginia (2003–2008)
 Cary Street Field; Richmond, Virginia (2004)
 Sports Backers Stadium; Richmond, Virginia (2005–2008)

References

External links
 Richmond Kickers

Defunct Premier Development League teams
Defunct soccer clubs in Virginia
Richmond Kickers
Reserve soccer teams in the United States
Association football clubs established in 2002
Association football clubs disestablished in 2009
2002 establishments in Virginia
2009 disestablishments in Virginia